Tommaso Chiecchi (born 12 November 1979) is an Italian former professional footballer who played as a defender. He is the head coach of GSD Ambrosiana.

Career
Chiecchi started his career at his native club Chievo, but after playing 22 Serie B games, he was loaned to various Serie C1 clubs for  seasons (first half of 2002–03 season remained in Chievo) and sold to Foggia and Vittoria (both from Serie C1) in a co-ownership deal until July 2005 staying in Modena of Serie B. He was bought back by Chievo by terminating the co-ownership deal in June 2006, which Chievo also gave the remained 50% registration rights for Cristian Bucchi to Modena. He was loaned back to Modena on 13 July, along with Simone Bentivoglio.

After failing to protect the Serie A seat, Chievo recalled Chiecchi on 1 July 2007 for their Serie B campaign, he was awarded the no.3 shirt but he was rarely used. Chiecchi was loaned to the Lega Pro 1st Division for Lumezzane along with Amedeo Calliari in July 2008 after Chievo was promoted back to Serie A.

In 2009, he remained at Prima Divisione, for Pro Patria. On 20 July 2010, he was transferred to Lecco for free.

In the summer of 2011, he was signed by Serie D club Sarego, a club from his home region Veneto. He followed the club relegated to Eccellenza Veneto in 2012.

Honours
Chievo
Serie B: 2007–08

References

External links
 FIGC National team data 
 Profile at La Gazzetta dello Sport (2006–07) 
 Profile at La Gazzetta dello Sport (2007–08) 
 Profile at Football.it 

Italian footballers
A.C. ChievoVerona players
S.P.A.L. players
S.S.D. Lucchese 1905 players
F.C. Lumezzane V.G.Z. A.S.D. players
S.S.D. Varese Calcio players
Calcio Foggia 1920 players
Modena F.C. players
Aurora Pro Patria 1919 players
Calcio Lecco 1912 players
Association football defenders
Sportspeople from the Province of Verona
1979 births
Living people
F.C. Vittoria players
Footballers from Veneto